Albert Pujols (born 1980) is a Dominican-American baseball player.

Pujols may also refer to:

People
Francesc Pujols (1882–1962), Catalan writer and philosopher
Luis Pujols (born 1955), Major League Baseball player

Places
Pujols, Gironde, a commune in Gironde, France
Pujols, Lot-et-Garonne, a commune in Lot-et-Garonne, France
Les Pujols, a commune in Ariège, France

See also
Pujol (disambiguation)
Pujols-sur-Ciron, a commune in Gironde, France
Puyol
US Pujols XIII, a French Rugby club

Catalan-language surnames